Stanowice  (German Stanowitz, 1937-1945 Standorf) is a village in the administrative district of Gmina Czerwionka-Leszczyny, within Rybnik County, Silesian Voivodeship, in southern Poland.

The village has a population of 2,254.

History
The village was first mentioned in a Latin document of Diocese of Wrocław called Liber fundationis episcopatus Vratislaviensis from around 1305 as iem in Stanowitz decima episcopalis.

References

Villages in Rybnik County